Fort McKavett is a ghost town in Menard County, Texas, United States that was occupied for a while by local Hispanics after its decommissioning as a fort until the 1970s.  It lies at the intersections of Farm to Market Road 864 and Farm to Market Road 1674, 20 miles southwest of the county seat, Menard.  Its elevation is 2,169 feet (661 m).  It has a post office with the ZIP code 76841.

History

The settlement of Fort McKavett had its 1850s origins as a civilian population just north of Camp San Saba in Menard County (not the Camp San Saba in McCulloch County), with the name of Scabtown. Camp San Saba closed in 1859, and many residents fled to safer areas to be protected against Indian depredations. The United States Army reopened the outpost in 1869 as Fort McKavett. As the civilian population of Scabtown grew, the community was renamed after Fort McKavett, and the local economy began to thrive. The Army closed the fort in 1883, but the earlier relocation of native American tribes made the civilians feel safe enough to remain. The population grew, and with it an economy that supported two hotels, three churches, a newspaper, and a mattress factory. The population peaked at 150 at the beginning of the 20th century, but declined in the latter half of the century.

The writer Robert E. Howard, a Texas history enthusiast, visited Fort McKavett in 1933, and wrote: "McKavett is fascinating - a village of ruins and semiruins, people living in the old unruined barracks and officers's quarters, among the remnants of other buildings which had not stood the test of time.

Notable people

Harry D. Thiers
E.B. Beaumont

Climate
The climate in this area is characterized by hot, dry summers and generally mild to cool winters.  According to the Köppen climate classification system, Fort McKavett has a mid-latitude arid desert climate, BWk on climate maps.

References

External links
 

Unincorporated communities in Menard County, Texas
Unincorporated communities in Texas
Ghost towns in Central Texas